The following is a list of events affecting Canadian television in 2015. Events listed include television show debuts, finales, cancellations, and channel launches, closures and rebrandings.

Events

Notable events

January

February

March

April

May

June

December

Television programs

Programs debuting in 2015

Changes of network affiliation

Programs ending in 2015

Television stations

Stations changing network affiliation

Network conversions and rebrandings

Deaths

See also
 2015 in Canada
 List of Canadian films of 2015

References